Hondarrabi beltza is a red variety of Vitis vinifera, that is native of the Basque Country, Spain. It is the grape used to make red txacoli wine, which is not as common as the traditional white txacoli.

References

Red wine grape varieties
Spanish wine